Reasons is an album by the Northern Sámi folk music group Angelit, released in 2003 in Finland. The musical tracks consist mainly of traditional Sámi yoiking.

Track listing
The fifteen tracks are:
 "Ikte"  – 0:53
 "Luovus"  – 4:08
 "Hobo"  – 4:27
 "Buohkain Mis Miella"  – 4:21
 "Doudu"  – 3:59
 "Dajadan"  – 4:01
 "Dongo Dat Ledjet"  – 4:45
 "Otne"  – 1:10
 "Állet Jáhke Su"  – 4:24
 "In Jeara"  – 4:51
 "Luohti"  – 0:52
 "Dollabuollin"  – 4:15
 "Virtualnoaidi"  – 6:20
 "Rukses Ruusu"  – 5:13
 "Ihtin"  – 0:21

References

2003 albums
Angelit albums